Chaotic Wonderland is the first Japanese-language extended play by South Korean boy band Tomorrow X Together. It was released by Big Hit Music and Universal Music Japan on November 10, 2021. Thematically, it follows their previous album The Chaos Chapter: Freeze, released in May 2021. The EP contains two Japanese versions of previous Korean releases, their first English single "Magic", and an original Japanese song "Ito".

Background
TXT began 2021 by releasing their first Japanese studio album Still Dreaming on January 20, marking an end to The Dream Chapter series. Later, in May 2021 they began The Chaos Chapter with the release of their second Korean studio album named The Chaos Chapter: Freeze and its repackage album The Chaos Chapter: Fight or Escape on May 31 and August 17 respectively. On September 6, 2021, Big Hit Music announced that TXT would be releasing their first Japanese extended play on November 10, 2021. Originally, the Japanese featuring artist for "0x1=Lovesong" was undisclosed. Beginning October 22, Universal Music Japan teased the reveal with a set of clues via Twitter. The artist was revealed five days later as Ikuta Lilas, also known as Ikura, the main vocalist for Japanese musical duo Yoasobi.

On September 20, the also-undisclosed Japanese original song was revealed to be "Ito", written by Japanese pop-rap male vocal quartet Greeeen. The song revolves around the themes of attachment, like two people who are each one half of a thread meeting to make one thread. It comes from the feelings you get from forming a deep relationship with someone. Ito is also featured as the opening theme for the TV Tokyo's television drama,  which began airing on October 15, 2021.

Release and promotion

In September, it was announced that TXT would appear in the December 2021 edition of Numéro Tokyo, slated for release on October 28. On October 26, two days prior to the release, the front covers were revealed with a snippet about their interview. The group also appeared on the front cover of "ar"'s December 2021 issue, released on November 12. This will be the first time that a male overseas artist has featured on the front cover.

On November 3, 2021, following the TV-sized release for Spiral Labyrinth, "Ito" was pre-released as a digital single available on streaming platforms worldwide.

Track listing

Notes
  signifies an additional vocal producer.

Personnel
Credits adapted from Tidal and the liner notes of Chaotic Wonderland.

Musicians

 Tomorrow X Together – primary artist 
 Soobin – songwriting, backing vocals 
 Yeonjun – backing vocals , songwriting 
 Beomgyu – songwriting 
 Taehyun – backing vocals , songwriting 
 Hueningkai – backing vocals , songwriting 
 Lilas Ikuta – featured artist 
 Revin – songwriting , gang vocals 
 Slow Rabbit – songwriting 
 RM – songwriting 
 Derek "Mod Sun" Smith – songwriting, backing vocals 
 Andrew Migliore – songwriting 
 Melanie Joy Fontana – songwriting, backing vocals 
 "Hitman" Bang – songwriting 
 Danke – songwriting 
 Will Smiths – songwriting 
 Gabriel Brandes – songwriting , backing vocals 
 Matt Thomson – songwriting 
 Max Lynedoch Graham – songwriting 
 No Love For The Middle Child – backing vocals 
 Soma Genda – backing vocals 

 Kanata Okajima – Japanese lyrics 
 Greeeen – songwriting 
 William Segerdahl – backing vocals 
 Matt Thomson – songwriting 
 Max Lynedoch Graham – songwriting 
 Alex Karlsson – songwriting 
 Big Hit Music – songwriting 
 James F Reynolds – songwriting 
 Vendors (Kevin Leinster jr.) – backing vocals 
 Hiromi – Japanese lyrics 
 Olly Murs – songwriting 
 Sarah Blanchard – songwriting 
 Richard Boardman – songwriting 
 Pablo Bowman – songwriting, backing vocals 
 Anders Froen – songwriting 
 Aaron Hibell – songwriting 
 Jenna Andrews – backing vocals 
 Stephen Kirk – backing vocals

Instrumentation

 Slow Rabbit – keyboard, synthesizer 
 Aaron Sterling — live drum 
 Young – guitar  
 Andrew DeRoberts – guitar 
 Alysa – keyboard, synthesizer 
 Ricki Ejderkvist – guitar 

 Matt Thomson – keyboard, synthesizer, guitar 
 Max Graham – keyboard, synthesizer, guitar 
 James F Reynolds – keyboard 
 Aaron Hibell – keyboard 
 Richard Boardman – synthesizer 
 Pablo Bowman – guitar

Production

 Slow Rabbit – production , vocal arrangement 
 Alysa – production 
 Soma Genda – vocal arrangement 
 Arcades – production 
 Revin – vocal arrangement 
 El Capitxn – vocal arrangement 

 The Six – production 
 Aaron Hibell – production 
 Jenna Andrews – vocal production 
 Rob Grimaldi – vocal production 
 Stephen Kirk – vocal production

Technical

 Slow Rabbit – digital editing , engineering 
 Hiroya Takayama (Sony Music Studios Tokyo) – digital editing, engineering 
 Aaron Sterling – engineering 
 J.C. Powys – engineering assistance 
 Young – engineering 
 Michel “Lindgren” Schulz – engineering 
 Adam Hawkins – mixing 
 Chris Gehringer – mastering 
 Soma Genda – engineering, digital editing 
 Jeon Bu Yeon – engineering 

 D.O.I – mixing 
 Revin – digital editing 
 Son Yujeong – engineering 
 El Capitxn – engineering 
 Kim Hyun Soo – engineering 
 Alex Karlsson – engineering 
 Gabriel Brandes – engineering 
 Yang Ga – mixing 
 John Hanes – mixing

Charts

Weekly charts

Monthly charts

Year-end charts

Certifications and sales

Release history

See also
List of Oricon number-one albums of 2021
List of Billboard Japan Hot Albums number ones of 2021
List of K-pop albums on the Billboard charts

Footnotes

References

External links
 Oricon album profile (in Japanese)
 

2021 EPs
Tomorrow X Together albums
Japanese-language EPs
Republic Records EPs
Universal Music Japan EPs
Universal Music Group albums